Foster Creek is a stream in the U.S. state of South Dakota.

Foster Creek has the name of Charles Foster, a local cattleman.

See also
List of rivers of South Dakota

References

Rivers of Stanley County, South Dakota
Rivers of South Dakota